The 2009 Women's International Sport Group British Open Squash Championships were held at the National Squash Centre in Manchester from 9–14 September 2009. The event was won for the fourth time by Rachael Grinham who defeated Madeline Perry in the final. The British Open would not be held again until 2012 following sponsorship problems.

Seeds

Draw and results

First qualifying round

Final qualifying round

First round

Quarter finals

Semi finals

Final

References

Women's British Open Squash Championships
Squash in England
Sports competitions in Manchester
Women's British Open Squash Championship
2000s in Manchester
Women's British Open Squash Championship
2009 in women's squash